Gentiana pneumonanthe, the marsh gentian, is a species of the genus Gentiana. It was the first wildflower announced as flower of the year in Germany in 1980. The species can be found in marshes and moorlands. It is the host-plant of the Alcon blue (Phengaris alcon).

References

pneumonanthe
Flora of Europe
Flora of Germany
Plants described in 1753
Taxa named by Carl Linnaeus